The Marind–Yaqai (Marind–Yakhai) languages are a well established language family of Papuan languages, spoken by the Marind-anim. They form part of the Trans–New Guinea languages in the classifications of Stephen Wurm and Malcolm Ross, and were established as part of the Anim branch of TNG by Timothy Usher.

Languages
The languages are:
 Marind
 Yaqay branch: Warkay-Bipim, Yaqay

Proto-language

Phonemes
Usher (2020) reconstructs the consonant inventory as follows:

{| 
| *m || *n ||  ||  
|-
| *p || *t ||  || *k 
|-
| *b || *d || || *g 
|-
| *mb || *nd || || *ŋg 
|-
|  || *s ||  || *h
|-
| *w || *ɾ || *j || *ɣ
|}
Vowels are *a *e *i *o *u.

Pronouns
The pronouns are:
{| 
! !!sg!!pl
|-
!1
|*nok|| ?
|-
!2
|*oɣ||*eoɣ
|-
!3m
|*anep||rowspan=2|*anip
|-
!3f
|*anup
|}

Classification
The Marind languages were partially identified by Sidney Herbert Ray and JHP Murray in 1918; the family was filled out by JHMC Boelaars in 1950. It was incorporated into Trans–New Guinea by Stephen Wurm in 1975.

The Boazi languages were formerly classified as Marind.

Evolution
Marind reflexes of proto-Trans-New Guinea (pTNG) etyma:

kase ‘saliva’ < pTNG *kasipa ‘spit’
maŋgat ‘mouth’ < *maŋgat[a]
mudu-meŋ ‘belly’ < *mundu-maŋgV ‘heart’
mokom ‘fruit, seed’ < *maŋgV
saŋga ‘hand, finger, arm’ < *sa(ŋg,k)(a,i)l ‘hand, claw’
sâ ‘sand’ < *sa(ŋg,k)asiŋ
de ‘tree’ < *inda
iwar ‘wind’ < *kumbutu
kuyu ‘cassowary’ < *ku(y)a

See also
Marind people

Further reading
Drabbe, Petrus. 1950. Twee dialecten van de Awju-taal [Two dialects of the Awyu language]. Bijdragen tot de Taal-, Land- en Volkenkunde 106: 92–147.
Drabbe, Petrus. 1954a. Comparative Vocabulary 100 words in 24 languages. Posieux/Fribourg: Instituut Anthropos.
Drabbe, Petrus. 1954b. Talen en dialecten van zuid-west Nieuw-Guinea [Languages and Dialects of Southwest New Guinea]. Posieux/Fribourg: Instituut Anthropos.
Drabbe, Petrus. 1955. Spraakkunst van het Marind: Zuidkust Nederlands Nieuw-Guinea [A Grammar of Marind: South Coast of New Guinea]. Wien-Mödling: Drukkerij van het Missiehuis St. Gabriël.

References

External links 
 Timothy Usher, New Guinea World, Proto–Marind–Yakhai

 
Languages of Papua New Guinea
Anim languages